Chivas USA (pronounced CHEE-vahs) was an American professional soccer team that was based in the Los Angeles suburb of Carson, California. The club played from 2005 to 2014 in Major League Soccer (MLS) and was a subsidiary of Mexican club C.D. Guadalajara, sharing common ownership and branding.

The club was the eleventh MLS team upon its entry into the league in 2004. Chivas USA was intended to be seen as a "little brother" to its parent club C.D. Guadalajara, one of the most widely supported and successful teams in Mexico. Chiva is Latin American Spanish for "goat", seen as a tough and resilient animal in Mexico, and is the nickname of C.D. Guadalajara.

Chivas USA played its home games at the StubHub Center in Carson, which it shared with its rival, the LA Galaxy. The club was originally owned by Antonio Cue and Jorge Vergara, who also owned C.D. Guadalajara. In 2014, MLS purchased the club from Vergara with plans to sell to new owners.

The club ceased operations after the 2014 regular season, and is currently the most recent major professional North American sports team to fold.

History

Founding 

Mexican businessman Jorge Vergara took ownership of the struggling Chivas de Guadalajara in 2002 and sought to use the rejuvenated club to establish an international brand. In June 2003, the league announced that the 2003 MLS All-Star Game would be played against Chivas and that Vergara was interested in purchasing an expansion team. The team, named "Chivas USA", would be affiliated with Chivas and play in either Los Angeles or San Diego beginning in the 2005 season. On August 2, 2004, Major League Soccer announced that Chivas USA would share The Home Depot Center in Carson with the Galaxy, and begin play in 2005 as the league's eleventh team.

Early success (2005–2009) 

In 2005, Chivas USA kicked off its inaugural season in Major League Soccer at The Home Depot Center with a 2–0 loss to then MLS Cup Champions D.C. United on April 2, 2005, under the guidance of Chivas USA's first head coach Thomas Rongen. After a 1–8–1 start (their sole win coming against fellow expansion club Real Salt Lake), Thomas Rongen was named Chivas USA's sporting director and assistant coach Javier Ledesma became the club's interim head coach. On June 3, 2005, Hans Westerhof was named Chivas USA's second head coach. After a disappointing season, Westerhof did not return to coach the team in 2006.

On November 23, 2005, former MLS Coach of the Year Bob Bradley became Chivas USA's third head coach, replacing Hans Westerhof. Under Bradley, the 2006 season saw a major turnaround for Chivas USA. The team finished the 2006 season with a 10–9–13 record and earned a spot in the Western Conference playoffs. Bradley was named MLS Coach of the Year, becoming the first two-time winner of the award and Chivas USA defender Jonathan Bornstein was named 2006 Gatorade Rookie of the Year. After the season ended, Coach Bradley was named interim head coach of the U.S. men's national soccer team and head coach of the U.S. men's Olympic soccer team by the U.S. Soccer Federation, and was replaced by Chivas USA's fourth head coach, Predrag "Preki" Radosavljevic.

The team's third season, under Preki, was the most successful. Chivas USA goalkeeper Brad Guzan was named MLS's Goalkeeper of the Year for the 2007 season. On November 7, 2007, Preki was named MLS Coach of the Year for 2007 after the first-year manager led the Red-and-White to a 15–7–8 record and first place in Major League Soccer's Western Conference. In January 2008, Preki signed a multi-year contract with Chivas USA securing his position as head coach for the 2008 season. Chivas finished the 2007 MLS season atop of the Western Conference. However, they lost in the Conference Semifinals of the MLS Cup 2007 playoffs to the Kansas City Wizards, who were the conference's No. 4 seed under new MLS seeding rules despite being in the Eastern Conference.

In 2008 Chivas USA competed in their first official international tournament, playing Pachuca in the 2008 SuperLiga. Jonathan Bornstein and Sacha Kljestan were named to the MLS All-Star team. Goalie Brad Guzan became the first Goat to transfer to a European first division club. The Red-and-White clinched a playoff berth for the third consecutive season, losing to Real Salt Lake in the first round. Kljestan scored the U.S. Soccer Goal of the Year while playing in the 2008 Beijing Olympics. He was also named to the MLS Best XI, and was selected as U.S. Soccer's Young Male Athlete of the Year.

Jonathan Bornstein and Sacha Kljestan competed with the U.S. National Team in the 2009 FIFA Confederations Cup in South Africa. Chivas USA goalkeeper Zach Thornton was named to the 2009 MLS All-Star Team. Chivas USA announced the Team Award Winners, naming Thornton the team's Most Valuable Player. Thornton was also named the MLS Goalkeeper of the Year and MLS Comeback Player of the Year, and he was nominated to the MLS Best 11.

Club struggles (2010–2013) 

Martín Vásquez was named the team's head coach after serving as an assistant coach from 2005 to 2007. Kljestan and Bornstein were named co-captains for the 2010 season. During the World Cup break Kljestan signed a deal with Belgian club Anderlecht, leaving Chivas USA after parts of five seasons. Bornstein played in the 2010 FIFA World Cup, starting in two matches for the United States as they made it to the Round of 16. On October 27, the team released head coach Martín Vásquez from his contract. On November 2, president and CEO Shawn Hunter announced he was stepping down. On December 14 the club's vice president of soccer operations, Stephen Hamilton revealed he too, was leaving his post. After Hamilton stepped down, Jose L Domene was named Interim General Manager. On January 4, 2011, Robin Fraser became head coach of Chivas USA.

On August 29, 2012, Vergara and his wife, Angélica Fuentes, became sole owners of the club, buying out former partners Antonio and Lorenzo Cué. On May 29, 2013, two Chivas USA youth coaches, Dan Calichman and Ted Chronopoulos, filed a discrimination lawsuit against the club, on the grounds they had been dismissed because they were not Latino.  Shortly after the acquisition of the club, Vergara is alleged to have told his staff that those who did not speak Spanish would be fired. Chronopoulos claimed that Jose David, the team's new president and chief business officer, asked Chronopoulos for a list of youth players and coaches who were Mexican or Mexican American and of those that weren't.

Following the release of Preki, Chivas USA failed to stay consistent on and off the field, just like its parent club, CD Guadalajara, Chivas USA had four coaches after the start of the 2010 season; all four coaches failed to impress Jorge Vergara, and were let go.  Their last coach was Colombian-born Wilmer Cabrera.

Final season (2014) 

On February 20, 2014, Major League Soccer purchased Chivas USA from Vergara. They announced plans to sell to a buyer dedicated to keeping the club in Los Angeles, as well as a plan to rebrand the club in time for the 2015 MLS season. ESPN reported on September 29, 2014, that the club would suspend operations at the end of the MLS regular season, according to multiple sources.

On September 30, 2014, Grant Wahl of Sports Illustrated reported that a group of investors headed by Henry Nguyen, Los Angeles Dodgers investor Peter Guber and Cardiff City owner Vincent Tan agreed to purchase the club for a fee over $100 million. The sale would mean that Chivas USA would fold, with the second Los Angeles team to take the field as an expansion team with a new stadium in Downtown Los Angeles.

Chivas USA ceased operations on October 27, 2014, with its player development academy continuing to be operated by MLS until June 2015. A dispersal draft took place after the 2014 season, having the remaining players from the club dispersed to other teams in the league. The league added two teams (New York City FC and Orlando City SC) to increase the total number from 19 to 20, with Kansas City and Houston shifting to the Western Conference to keep the conferences balanced. Los Angeles FC began play in 2018. They are not considered by the league to be a continuation of Chivas USA.

Colors and badge 

Chivas USA's home uniform mirrored that of their parent club, Guadalajara, with a red-and-white striped shirt, blue shorts and blue socks. Chivas USA wore variations throughout its existence (with slight variations in trim, stripe width, number of stripes, and other minor details), and usually complemented this with a dark blue away uniform.

The club badge was also virtually identical to that of Guadalajara, featuring the coat of arms of the city, but omitting the stars around the outside of the logo that represent each league title won by Guadalajara.

Ownership 

 Jorge Vergara & Antonio Cué Sánchez-Navarro (August 2, 2004 – August 28, 2012)
 Jorge Vergara (August 29, 2012 – February 19, 2014)
 Major League Soccer (February 20, 2014 – October 27, 2014)

Stadium 

 StubHub Center; Carson, California (2005–2014)
 Harder Stadium; Santa Barbara, California (2006) 1 game in U.S. Open Cup
 Titan Stadium; Fullerton, California (2008, 2010) 2 games in U.S. Open Cup and North American SuperLiga

Chivas USA played its home games at StubHub Center,  on the campus of California State University, Dominguez Hills in Carson, California, approximately 10 miles south of downtown Los Angeles. Built in 2003 as the home stadium for LA Galaxy, the "SHC" is a 27,000-seat soccer-specific stadium, the second of its kind in MLS, but has hosted other sports such as rugby and football.  For its entire existence, Los Rojiblancos shared the stadium with the Galaxy, with whom they competed for the Honda SuperClasico.  During their tenure, this arrangement and those of the NFL's New York Giants and New York Jets in MetLife Stadium and NBA's Los Angeles Clippers and Los Angeles Lakers in the Staples Center were the only cases in the major professional sports leagues in the United States and Canada of two teams of the same league sharing a venue.

Chivas USA occasionally held home games at Titan Stadium on the campus of California State University, Fullerton, and at Harder Stadium on the campus of UC Santa Barbara, such as in the US Open Cup when both they and the Galaxy had been drawn to play at home on the same day, but this was generally a rare occurrence.

Sponsorship 

On May 16, 2007, Comex, Mexico's leading paint company, became Chivas USA's first presenting sponsor, with their name on the front of the jerseys. At the opening of the 2010 season, the team's jerseys were blank.  On April 1, 2010, the new presenting sponsor, Extra, was finally unveiled prior to the match against rivals LA Galaxy; Extra is a Mexican convenience store chain owned by Grupo Modelo, the makers of Corona beer.  The chain's logo appeared on the front of Chivas USA jerseys and training jerseys for the rest of that year. On February 16, 2011 Corona became the presenting sponsor for Chivas USA.

Broadcasting 

For the 2014 season, Chivas USA non nationally televised matches were televised by KDOC in English and Time Warner Cable Deportes in Spanish. KDOC agreed to televise 10 matches while Time Warner Cable Deportes agreed to televise 16 matches. Matches not televised in Spanish on Time Warner Cable Deportes aired on the Univision family of networks (UniMas, Galavision, Univision Deportes Network).

Until 2012, FS West/Prime Ticket and KDOC televised all Chivas USA matches that were not nationally televised. In 2013, Chivas began the year with no local television partner; however, in August a deal was reached with KDOC (English) and MundoFOX22 KWHY-TV (Spanish) for the remainder of the 2013 season.

KWKW-AM (ESPN Deportes Radio) provided Spanish-language radio broadcasts.

Players and staff

Notable former players 

Footballers who received international caps while playing for Chivas.

  Ante Jazić (2009–12)
  Chris Pozniak (2008)
  Darío Delgado (2010)
  Douglas Sequeira (2005)
  Michael Umaña (2010–11)
  Oswaldo Minda (2012–14)
  Steve Purdy (2013)
  Osael Romero (2010)
  Marvin Chávez (2014)
  Amado Guevara (2007–08)
  Ramón Núñez (2007)

  Shavar Thomas (2007–09)
  Juan Pablo García (2005–06)
  Erick Torres (2013–14)
  Francisco Palencia (2005–06)
  Ramón Ramírez (2005–07)
  Claudio Suárez (2006–09)
  Andrew Boyens (2011)
  Simon Elliott (2011)
  Tony Lochhead (2014)
  Atiba Harris (2008–09)
  Ezra Hendrickson (2005)

  Raphaël Wicky (2008)
  Juan Agudelo (2012–13)
  Jonathan Bornstein (2006–10)
  Brad Guzan (2005–08)
  Sacha Kljestan (2006–10)
  Jesse Marsch (2006–09)
  John O'Brien (2006)
  Heath Pearce (2011–12)
  Ante Razov (2006–09)
  Giancarlo Maldonado (2010)
  Alejandro Moreno (2011–12)

 See also All-time Chivas USA roster

Head coaches

Honors 
MLS Western Conference (Regular Season)
 Winners (1): 2007

Record

Year-by-year 

This is a partial list of the last five seasons completed by Chivas. For the full season-by-season history, see List of Chivas USA seasons.

1. Avg. attendance include statistics from league matches only.
2. Top goalscorer(s) includes all goals scored in League, MLS Cup Playoffs, U.S. Open Cup, CONCACAF Champions League, FIFA Club World Cup, and other competitive continental matches.

International tournaments 

 2008 North American SuperLiga
 Group Stage v.  Pachuca – 1:2
 Group Stage v.  Santos Laguna – 1:0
 Group Stage v.  New England Revolution – 1:1

 2008–09 CONCACAF Champions League
 Preliminary Round v.  Tauro – 1:3 aggregate over 2 legs

 2009 North American SuperLiga
 Group Stage v.  UANL – 1:2
 Group Stage v.  Chicago Fire – 0:1
 Group Stage v.  San Luis – 1:1

 2010 North American SuperLiga
 Group Stage v.  Puebla – 1:2
 Group Stage v.  Houston Dynamo – 1:1
 Group Stage v.  Pachuca – 1:0

Team records 

 Goals: Ante Razov (30)
 Most Goals in a season: Erick Torres (15)
 Most consecutive league matches scored in: Erick Torres six matches (six goals)
 Assists: Sacha Kljestan (33)
 Most Assists in a season: Sacha Kljestan (13)
 Games Played: Dan Kennedy (144)
 Minutes Played: Dan Kennedy (12764)
 Shots: Ante Razov (234)
 Shots on Goal: Ante Razov (100)
 Game-Winning Goals: Ante Razov (10)
 Penalty Kick Goals: Erick Torres (6)
 Multi-Goal Games: Ante Razov (5)
 Saves: Dan Kennedy (451)
 Shutouts: Dan Kennedy (28)

MLS regular season only, through 2014 season

 All-Time regular season record: 92–149–79  (Through October 27, 2014)

Average attendance 

regular season / playoffs

 2005: 17,080 / missed playoffs
 2006: 19,840 / 15,110
 2007: 14,305 / 19,711
 2008: 15,114 / 19,265
 2009: 16,107 / 25,218
 2010: 14,575 / missed playoffs
 2011: 14,830 / missed playoffs
 2012: 13,056 / missed playoffs
 2013: 8,366 / missed playoffs
 2014: 7,063 / missed playoffs

See also 

 C.D. Guadalajara – club with which this club was affiliated
 Jorge Vergara

References 

 
 
 
 Chivas USA: News: Article

Citations 

 
Association football clubs established in 2004
Association football clubs disestablished in 2014
2004 establishments in California
2014 disestablishments in California
Defunct Major League Soccer teams
Defunct soccer clubs in California
Diaspora soccer clubs in the United States